Pitt's Head (Welsh: Carreg Collwyn) is a distinctive rock located at grid reference , close to the A4085 road in Gwynedd, Wales. Its distinction lies in a resemblance to the profile of politician William Pitt the Younger.

Geography
Located as it is near the base of  one of the paths to the summit of Snowdon, Pitt's Head Halt was a station on the original Welsh Highland Railway, also marking the highest point on that railway. The present reconstruction of the railway does not envisage reopening the halt. The rock gives its name to the Pitt's Head Bridge, where the railway passes under the A4085,  and the nearby Pitt's Head Cutting.

In the geology of the region, the rock gives its name to the rock of which it is formed, the Pitt's Head Tuff. This is an Ordovician acid ash-flow tuff which outcrops on the northern flanks of Snowdonia.

The correct name for this rock cluster is Cerrig Collwyn, Pitt's Head is only a name for one of these rocks. Collwyn ap Tango was said to be Lord of Eifionnydd, Ardudwy and part of Llŷn.

Resemblance

Sources
 Cerrig Collwyn - See : Hynodion Gwlad y Bryniau - Cyfres Llafar Gwlad rhif 48 tudalen 7. By Steffan Ab Ioan
 The Lakes of Eryri  Geraint Roberts   Gwasg Carreg Gwalch 1995
 Leigh's guide to Wales & Monmouthshire, 1835, p. 71 Digitised
  — However, this reference confuses irretrievably the town of Colwyn Bay on the North Wales Coast, and the River Colwyn which is close to Pitt's Head. There is no connection between the two apart from the name, but the Encyclopedia places Pitt's Head close to Colwyn Bay. It is nevertheless a source for the name of Pitt's Head.
 British Geological Survey, England and Wales Sheet 118

Further reading
 Magmatic Evolution of the Ordovician Snowdon Volcanic Centre, North Wales (UK) THORPE et al. Journal of Petrology. 1993; 34: 711-741

see also references in Welsh Highland Railway

External links
 Bank of England statue
 Brown University Library – contemporary caricature

Betws Garmon
Rock formations of Gwynedd
Rock formations of Snowdonia
Geology of Wales
Welsh Highland Railway
William Pitt the Younger